The splendid alfonsino (Beryx splendens) is an alfonsino of the genus Beryx, found around the world at depths between , usually between . It is known as kinmedai (金目鯛) or "golden eye snapper" in sushi and Japanese cuisine.

Served at traditional Edomae sushi restaurants, this fish is usually aged for 2 to 3 days after being dispatched using the ikejime technique. The ageing allows the fish's natural enzymes to break down the proteins in the flesh, increasing the flavour and texture of the fish. It is usually served with its skin lightly blowtorched, grilled under a charcoal grill or lightly blanched using a technique called kawashimo-zukuri (皮霜造り/かわしもづくり).

Gallery

References

 
 Tony Ayling & Geoffrey Cox, Collins Guide to the Sea Fishes of New Zealand,  (William Collins Publishers Ltd, Auckland, New Zealand 1982)

External links
 

splendid alfonsino
Cosmopolitan fish
splendid alfonsino